Baddoo is a Ghanaian surname. Notable people with the surname include:

Akil Baddoo (born 1998), American baseball player
Samuel Glenn Baddoo (born 1934), Ghanaian Supreme Court Judge
Terry Baddoo, British television executive

See also
Badoo, a social network

Ghanaian surnames